Princess Jeongsin of the Gaeseong Wang clan (d. 4 May 1319), firstly called as Princess Jeonghwa or also known as Primary Consort Jeonghwa, was a Goryeo royal family member as the granddaughter of Duke Yangyang who became the first wife of her third cousin once removed, King Chungnyeol and also the aunt of King Chungseon's 3rd wife.

Biography

Early life and background
The future Princess Jeonghwa was born as the part of the Gaeseong Wang royal family as the daughter of Wang In, Duke Sian who was the grandson of King Sinjong through his second son, Duke Yangyang. She had 3 brothers, of which one would become the father of Chungseon's consort.

Marriage and Palace life
In 1260, during the first year reign of King Wonjong of Goryeo, she married with Crown Prince Wang Sim and became his princess consort (태자비, 太子妃). In 1274, Wang Sim married Kublai Khan's daughter, Qutugh Kelmysh as his new queen consort, which made Lady Wang couldn't become the queen although she was his principal wife when he was still a crown prince. She then demoted into the low rank, but still honoured as Princess Jeonghwa (정화궁주, 貞和宮主) and lived in the "Jeonghwa Palace" (정화궁, 貞和宮).

She was said to have a bad relationship and hated so much by Qutugh Kelmysh, making her lived in a separate palace and couldn't come close to the king. In 1275, a banquet was held to celebrate the birth of the new queen's first son. When Chungnyeol gave an order to put Princess Jeonghwa and Qutugh Kelmysh be placed in the same position, Qutugh Kelmysh considered that she was treated as equals to his first wife and became very angry while suddenly moved Jeonghwa's seat. After a while, Princess Jeonghwa knelt down and offered a glass of wine to her, but the King turned around and blinked and the banquet ended right away.

A year later in 1276 (2nd years reign of King Chungnyeol), a maid said that Princess Jeonghwa had a shaman to curse Qutugh Kelmysh and 43 people, including Duke Jean, plan to do something unpleasant and try to enter Ganghwa-do. Princess Jeonghwa then imprisoned in Najang (나장, 螺匠), but with the help of official Yu-Gyeong (유경, 柳璥), she was able to defend herself and be released along with the others who involved.

In 1284, there was an incident where Jeonghwa misunderstood the common people and made them a servant, which made they filed a lawsuit and called as Apryangsageon (압량사건, 壓良事件) since the judgment was made in favor of her under King Chungnyeol's order. However, the presiding judge Gim Seo (김서) who judged this case, died suddenly after appearing on the scene the day after the verdict and only Yi Haeng-geom (이행검) who was aware of the injustice of the case, survived alone.

Princess Jeonghwa was believed to devout in Buddhism and often prayed in Jeondeung Temple (전등사, 傳燈寺). Also, there are a record that she asked a Buddhist monk In Gi (인기, 印奇) to printed the Tripitaka Koreana and kept it in Jeondeung temple. Once became the primary wife (원비, 院妃) in the past, she was also known as Primary Consort Jeonghwa (정화원비, 貞和院妃).

Later life and death
After Princess Jeguk's death, King Chungnyeol abdicated the throne to his legitimate son in 1298, Princess Jeonghwa's title was changed into Princess Jeongsin (정신부주, 貞信府主) alongside Chungnyeol who was able to came back to the palace. After this, she and the retired king were lived together in Sangsu Palace (상수궁, 上壽宮) and King Chungseon also held a ceremony for them. She then passed away on 4 May 1319 and buried in the same year.

She bore Chungnyeol a son and 2 daughters. Although her only son, Duke Gangyang was the oldest son of the king, but couldn't ascended the throne since his half younger brother, Chungseon of Goryeo was the legitimate one. Meanwhile, Gangyang's 2nd son, Wang Go was favoured by Chungseon and her brother, Marquess Seowon's daughter become one of Chungseon's consort.

Others
Based on records left in Jeondeung Temple at 37–41, Jeondeungsa-ro, Gilsang-myeon, Ganghwa-gun, Incheon-si, it firstly founded during the Goguryeo periods with the name of "Jinjong Temple" (진종사, 眞宗寺) and changed into Jeondeung from the fact that Princess Jeonghwa delivered many jade lanterns to this temple as it was also her temple where she prays in.
In Yi Saek's poem that written in Jeondeung Temple in Daeju-ro, sometimes her name is appeared in there.

In popular culture
Portrayed by Kang Ye-sol in the 2017 MBC TV series The King in Love.

References

External links
Princess Jeonghwa on Goryeosa .
Princess Jeonghwa on Doosan Encyclopedia .
Princess Jeonghwa on Encykorea .
Princess Jeonghwa on EToday News .

14th-century births
14th-century deaths
Year of birth unknown
Royal consorts of the Goryeo Dynasty
14th-century Korean women
13th-century Korean women